Snake Eater II: The Drug Buster is a 1991 action film sequel to Snake Eater, written by Don Carmody and John Dunning, and directed by George Erschbamer. Star Lorenzo Lamas returns as ex-Marine Jack Kelly, out to right the wrongs of the big city. He is not alone in this adventure, though: his trusty sidekick "Speedboat" (Larry B. Scott) is always near. The film also stars Ron Palillo as Torchy.

Plot 
In this installment of the series Jack "Soldier" Kelly (Lorenzo Lamas) fights the inner city war on drugs with the help of his criminal and comedic sidekick "Speedboat" after a string of kids die from poison-laced drugs. Kelly immediately leaps into action by uncovering a cache of weapons he saved from his Marine days, and busting into a drug stronghold guns blazing, killing four dealers in the process. After his renegade efforts he’s arrested but saved from jail by his quick thinking lawyer who pleads insanity, sending Soldier to the insane asylum. Here he meets many "crazy" characters such as a neurotic computer programmer, a sexaholic former televangelist, and the pyromaniac known as "Torchy" that Soldier busted at the end of the original Snake Eater. This cast of oddball characters both assist and hinder Soldier's quest for justice, usually in cringeworthy fashion. After some hospital hijinks that allow Soldier a way of escaping unnoticed, he and Speedboat continue their fight against the drug dealers of the city; after a trail of explosives and bodies, Soldier and Speedboat do away with the crime bosses responsible for the poisoned drugs, killing them with their own tainted supply. Kelly is found not guilty of the earlier murders by reason of temporary insanity, despite killing about 20 other people in that time. The film ends with an extremely bizarre dance number by the mental institution cast mates and everyone is happy.

Cast
 Lorenzo Lamas as Officer Jack "Soldier" Kelly
 Michele Scarabelli as Dr. Pierce
 Larry B. Scott as "Speedboat"
 Jack Blum as Billy Ray
 Ron Palillo as "Torchy"
 Sonya Biddle as Lucinda
 Kathleen Kinmont as Detective Lisa Forester
 Harvey Atkin as Sidney Glassberg

External links
 

1990s action films
1990 films
Canadian independent films
English-language Canadian films
Canadian sequel films
American action films
Canadian action films
Martial arts films
Films produced by John Dunning
American sequel films
1990s English-language films
1990s American films
1990s Canadian films